Big Brother Slavnih ( Big Brother Famous) was the celebrity version of Big Brother in Slovenia.  It began on 3 October 2010, two and a half years after the Big Brother 2. Nina Osenar, who was hosted the previous seasons, returned to host the show.

As of October 27, 2010, this season averaged a 43% ratings share making it the highest-rated Slovenian season of Big Brother to air so far.

On Day 27, Big Brother Slovenia took part in a swap with Big Brother Finland 2010, in which Slovenia's Sandra swapped houses with Finland's Niko N. Ultimately, it was early front runner Jože Činč who won the season.

The baseline grand prize was €150,000. Housemates were to complete tasks every week during the show. For every incomplete task, Big Brother reduced the total prize by €15,000. After ten weeks, the total prize stood at €90,000. The lost €60,000 was given to charity.

Housemates

Činč
Jože Činč (known as Činč) is a T.V. presenter and radio host. Činč entered the house on Day 1.

Gena
Gena Zeneli is a dancer and choreographer, and Nana's husband. Gena entered the house on Day 1. Gena became the fifth housemate to be evicted from the house on Day 29. In a twist, Gena returned to the house on Day 50 as a full-fledged housemate.

Igor
Igor Misdaris is a musician. Igor entered the house on Day 1. Igor was put up for eviction by his fellow housemates on Day 2 after many of them noticed that he was having trouble integrating with the rest of the group. Igor became the fifth celebrity to be evicted from the house on Day 43.

Ines
Ines Juranovič is a Playmate and "Miss Hawaiian Tropic". Ines entered the house on Day 1.

Maki
Maki is a singer for the group Bacchus. Maki entered the house along with Mišo on Day 25.

Mišo
Mišo Kontrec is a musician and leader of the Slovenian band, Langa. Mišo entered the house along with Maki on Day 25.

Nana
Nana Zeneli is a T.V. presenter, and Gena's wife. Nana entered the house on Day 1. Nana became the fourth celebrity to be evicted from the house on Day 36.

Nena
Nena Muršič is a physical trainer known as "Miss Fitness". Nena entered the house on Day 1. Nena was put up for eviction by her fellow housemates on Day 2, against Igor, after having been deemed "selfish" and "bossy". Nena became the first celebrity to be evicted from the house on Day 8.

Pia
Ida "Pia" Vesel is an erotic dancer. Pia entered the house on Day 1. Pia became the third celebrity to be evicted from the house on Day 22.

Rok
Rok Kosmač is a musician and singer. Rok entered the house on Day 1. Rok became the second celebrity to be evicted from the house on Day 15.

Sandra
Sandra Auer is a 24-year-old T.V. presenter, radio DJ, and actor. Sandra entered the house on Day 1.

Teja
Teja Stražišar is an 18-year-old model. Teja entered the house on Day 43. Teja voluntarily left the house on Day 48.

Urška
Urška Čepin entered the house on Day 20. Urška became the seventh celebrity to be evicted from the house on Day 50.

Zlatko
Zlatan "Zlatko" Čordič is a rapper. Zlatko entered the house on Day 1. Zlatko was ejected from the house on Day 48.

Nominations table
Every week housemates nominate two fellow housemates for eviction. Intruders (those who join once the show is in progress) are exempt from nominations for their first week in the house, and are not allowed to nominate fellow housemates that week. The viewing public decide which nominated housemate is evicted.

Notes

In week five, Urška was automatically nominated for eviction by Big Brother for discussing the outside world.
As they had been the first three housemates to be "fired" in the previous week's task, only Igor, Ines, and Zlatko could be nominated for eviction and could not nominate.
In week six, Činč was automatically nominated for eviction by Big Brother for rule breaking.
In week six, Maki was automatically nominated for eviction by Big Brother for discussing the outside world.
In week six, Mišo was automatically nominated for eviction by Big Brother for discussing nominations.

References

External links
 http://bigbrother.24ur.com
 https://web.archive.org/web/20101006175816/http://bigbrother.si/

2010 Slovenian television seasons
Slovenian reality television series
Slovenia
2010s Slovenian television series
2010 Slovenian television series debuts

sl:Big Brother Slovenija